Rhine-Waal University of Applied Sciences or HSRW, is a young and fast-growing German public university that first opened for the winter semester of 2009/10. It is known to be the most international-oriented university in Germany and offers the majority of degree programs completely in English. Its two campuses are located in the cities of Kleve and in Kamp-Lintfort.
The university is named after the German river Rhine and Dutch river Waal. As of 2018, it offers a variety of both English- and German-language study programmes through four faculties: Faculty of Technology & Bionics, Faculty of Life Sciences, Faculty of Society and Economics and Faculty of Communication and Environment.

History 

The state government of North Rhine-Westphalia organized a competition for the creation of three new Universities on 28 May 2008. The applicants were Kleve and the "We-4"-cities (Kamp-Lintfort, Moers, Neukirchen and Rheinberg), but the concept of separate universities was  discarded. Instead, the two competing candidates Kleve and Kamp-Lintfort were assigned joint responsibility to establish a two-campus university in November 2008. In April 2009,  Prof. Dr. Marie-Louise Klotz and Prof. Dr. Martin Goch were appointed president and vice president of the university. The official founding date of the university was 1 May 2009.

In 2015, founding president Prof. Dr. Marie Klotz was replaced by Dr. Heide Naderer. Since 2019 Dr. Oliver Locker-Grütjen runs the office of the president.

Internationality 

As of 2018, half of the student body is international, coming from 122 different countries, with the percentage of international students steadily increasing year by year. Of all the bachelor's and master's programs offered at Rhine-Waal University, 75% are being taught completely in English, therefore it has a high proportion of Indian students, creating great strength in programming.

Tuition and fees 

Due to being a public university in the state of NRW, no tuition fees are charged no matter the nationality of the student. There is a semester contribution fee of €307.38 (as of 2020) to be paid each semester, which covers e.g. social services contribution, and unlimited public transportation within the entire state. The university offers merit-based scholarships of €3600 per year for outstanding students regardless of origin on an academic year by year basis. In 2017, this was awarded to 80 students.

Reputation 

The courses are accredited by AQAS and ASIIN. Recent graduates of the university moved on to become e.g. engineers at BMW and Lufthansa, or went to graduate schools such as University of Melbourne and KTH Royal Institute of Technology.

Location and campus 

The two campuses are located on the outskirts of Germany's most populous metropolitan region, the Rhine-Ruhr, which can only be reached by Cologne–Nijmegen railway.

References

External links 
 

Universities and colleges in North Rhine-Westphalia
Educational institutions established in 2009
Universities of Applied Sciences in Germany
2009 establishments in Germany